Fredrikstad Station is a railway station located at the city of Fredrikstad in Norway on the Østfold Line. The station is served by regional trains between Oslo and Halden with hourly headway by Vy.

History
The station was opened in 1879 as part of the Østfold Line. A restaurant was established by Norsk Spisevognselskap on 1 January 1948.

References

Railway stations in Østfold
Railway stations on the Østfold Line
Railway stations opened in 1879
1879 establishments in Norway
Buildings and structures in Fredrikstad